The Congolese ambassador in Belgium is the official representative of the Government in the Democratic Republic of the Congo to the Government of Belgium.

List of representatives

See also 
Democratic Republic of the Congo–Belgium relations

References 

Ambassadors of the Democratic Republic of the Congo to Belgium
Belgium
Congo Democratic Republic of the